Thomas John Leary (April 15, 1904 – August 6, 1976) was an American professional football player who spent four seasons in the National Football League from 1927 to 1931 with the Frankford Yellow Jackets, Staten Island Stapletons, and Newark Tornadoes. Leary appeared in 26 career games, making 20 starts.

References

1904 births
1976 deaths
Fordham University alumni
Players of American football from Massachusetts
Frankford Yellow Jackets players
Staten Island Stapletons
Newark Tornadoes players